Shigoyevo is a rural locality (a village) in Sizemskoye Rural Settlement, Sheksninsky District, Vologda Oblast, Russia. The population was 70 as of 2002.

Geography 
Shigoyevo is located 33 km north of Sheksna (the district's administrative centre) by road. Pyzheyevo is the nearest rural locality.

References 

Rural localities in Sheksninsky District